James Henry Glennon (11 February 1857 – 29 May 1940) was a United States Navy officer. He saw action in the Spanish–American War, the Philippine–American War, and World War I.

Early life and career, to World War I
Born in French Gulch, California, he was appointed a cadet midshipman on 24 September 1874.

While executive officer and navigator in the gunboat , he participated in the actions against the Philippine insurgents.

During 1912 to 1913 he was President of the Board of Naval Ordnance and of the Joint Army-Navy Board on smokeless powder.

World War I and postwar period
He served as Commandant of the Washington Navy Yard and Superintendent of the Naval Gun Factory from 1915 to early 1917 when he was appointed the Navy Department representative in a special mission under Elihu Root being sent to Russia. At the risk of his life, Glennon persuaded mutinous Russian sailors who had taken over Russian ships-of-war in the waters of Sevastopol, to restore command to their officers. After completing the mission to Russia, he took command of Battleship Division 5 with his flag in the battleship .

He was awarded the Navy Cross for meritorious service in this command, including the instruction of midshipmen and thousands of recruits for duty as armed guard crews of merchant ships.  Detached from this duty on 17 September 1918, he became Commandant of the 13th Naval District until 3 January 1919, then was Commandant of the 3rd Naval District at New York.

Having reached the statutory age for retirement, he was transferred to the Retired List on 1 February 1921. Rear Admiral James Henry Glennon died at Washington, D.C., 29 May 1940, and was buried at Arlington National Cemetery.

Namesakes

References

External links
 

1857 births
1940 deaths
American military personnel of the Spanish–American War
United States Navy personnel of World War I
Burials at Arlington National Cemetery
People from Shasta County, California
Recipients of the Navy Cross (United States)
United States Navy rear admirals
United States Naval Academy alumni
Admirals of World War I